The Volvo V60 is a compact estate (station wagon) produced by Volvo Cars related to the S60. The vehicle was first released in autumn 2010, facelifted in 2014, and is in its second generation since 2018.

The second generation V60 was launched in 2018 based on the Volvo Scalable Product Architecture platform. Both generations feature a "Cross Country" variant with an increased ride height.

First generation (2011–2018)

First generation models

V60

V60 Ocean Race

In February 2014, Volvo unveiled a special version of the V60 called Ocean Race Edition. Similar to other Ocean Race Editions that were released in the past, the new models feature unique details such as special alloy wheels and a cargo cover with the route of the 2014 to 2015 Volvo Ocean Race on it. Colour choice was limited to just four colours, one of them being the signature Ocean Race Blue. The interior features special Ocean Race themed detailing and contrast stitching.

V60 Polestar

In 2013 Volvo unveiled a special, limited version of the V60 called V60 Polestar. It is a reworked V60 that was developed by Polestar and went on sale in 2014 in limited markets only. Apart from a retuned engine delivering 350PS the car received a wide range of suspension upgrades which included special dampers made by Öhlins, six piston brakes by Brembo and new swaybars.

Cosmetic changes include custom 20" alloy wheels, a different front and rear splitter and contrasting coloured interior stitching. When first introduced the only available paint colours were black metallic or "Rebel Blue", later white and silver metallic colours were added.

In 2016, the model year 2017 V60 Polestar received an all new four-cylinder, 2.0-litre turbo engine replacing the old 3.0-litre six-cylinder.

V60 Plug-in Hybrid
A pre-production version of the Volvo V60 diesel-electric transmission plug-in hybrid was unveiled at the Geneva Motor Show in March 2011. The V60 plug in is the result of close cooperation between Volvo Cars and Swedish energy supplier Vattenfall.

In September 2012, Volvo announced that the first 1,000 units were sold out before the model year 2013 vehicles were delivered to the dealerships. The carmaker ramped up production of the 2014 model year to 5,000 units for 2013. The first 1,000 units of the Volvo V60 Plug-in Hybrid were part of a "Pure Limited" edition with electric silver livery. The diesel electric car also has aero designed 17 inch wheels, integrated exhaust tailpipes and a number of bodywork features in glossy black.

The V60 Plug in Hybrid features a six speed automatic transmission and the front wheels are driven by a five-cylinder, 2.4-litre D5 turbo diesel, which produces 215 hp and maximum torque of 440 Nm. The rear axle features ERAD (Electric Rear Axle Drive) in the form of an electric motor producing 70 hp and maximum torque of 200 Nm, powered from a 12 kWh lithium-ion battery pack.

The interaction between diesel and electric power is handled via a control system, and the driver has the option to choose the preferred driving mode via three buttons on the instrument panel: Pure, Hybrid and Power.

 In Pure Mode, the car runs only on its electric motor as much as possible. Battery range varies with terrain, climate and driving style.
 Hybrid Mode is the default mode whenever the car is started. The diesel engine and electric motor interact to provide a balance between driving pleasure and low environmental impact.
 In Power Mode, the hybrid system is optimised to give the car the best possible performance. The electric motor's quick torque delivery contributes to the car's 0 to 100 km/h acceleration time of 6.1 seconds.

In April 2014, Volvo announced the addition of an R Design version of its V60 Plug in Hybrid, which features a number of unique interior and exterior features that create a sporty look.

Markets and sales

Deliveries began in Sweden in the end of 2012, and in the United Kingdom began in June 2013. , sales were led by the Netherlands with 9,707 units registered, followed by Sweden with 1,388 units delivered. The Volvo V60 PHEV ranked as the second best selling plug in hybrid in Europe in 2013 and 2014, both times after the Mitsubishi Outlander P-HEV, and fell to fifth place in 2015. A total of 19,571 units have sold in Europe through December 2015.

Recognition

The Volvo V60 Plug-in Hybrid was one of the top three finalists for the 2013 World Green Car of the Year. The car won Car of The Year at the 2011 Middle East Motor Awards.

V60 Cross Country
The V60 Cross Country is the raised variant of the Volvo V60 first introduced in 2015. It is sold in both North American and European markets, and comes standard with all-wheel drive in North America.

Engines

Second generation (2018–present)

The second generation Volvo V60 is based on the Volvo SPA Platform, like the saloons Volvo S60, Volvo S90, and the SUVs Volvo XC60 and Volvo XC90. It went on sale in July 2018. The V60 is built in both Sweden and Belgium. In the U.S., since 2021, the V60 is only available as a Cross Country model with one gasoline powertrain, dubbed T5, though a Polestar Engineered enhancement is available as an option. In Europe, Volvo offers two gasoline engines, two diesel engines, and two plug-in hybrid powertrains to choose from. Over in Malaysia, the V60 facelift comes in a sole T8 Recharge Inscription variant, with a 2.0 litre turbocharged and supercharged four-cylinder engine with a rear-mounted electric motor.

Second generation models

V60

V60 Cross Country

Trim levels
Before 2022, the V60 was available in Momentum, R-Design, Inscription, Cross Country and Polestar trim levels.  For the 2022 models, Volvo has changed the trim levels to Core, Plus and Ultimate (in increasing order of quality and price).  It has also reduced the optional extras which can be added to the features specified for each trim level, to allow the production process to be streamlined.

Engines

Notes

References

External links
  (International)

V60
Station wagons
Front-wheel-drive vehicles
All-wheel-drive vehicles
Euro NCAP large family cars
Cars introduced in 2010
2010s cars
Plug-in hybrid vehicles